Black Diamonds (Hungarian: Fekete gyémántok) is a 1938 Hungarian drama film directed by Ladislao Vajda and starring Zita Szeleczky, Zoltán Greguss and Valéria Hidvéghy. It is based on an 1870 novel of the same name by Mór Jókai, the title referring to coal. It was remade in 1977.

The film's sets were designed by the art director József Pán.

Plot summary

Cast
 Zita Szeleczky as Evila 
 Zoltán Greguss as Szaffrán Péter - Evila võlegénye 
 Valéria Hidvéghy as Marica - bányászlány 
 Gyula Csortos as Sondersheim herceg 
 Pál Jávor as Berend Iván 
 László Kemény as Bányász 
 Gerö Mály as Spitzhase 
 László Misoga as Bányász 
 Kálmán Rózsahegyi as Pali bácsi 
 Gyula Szöreghy as Kocsmáros 
 Jenö Törzs as Kaulmann Félix, bankár 
 Zoltán Várkonyi as Bányász

References

Bibliography
 Judson Rozenblit. Constructing Nationalities in East Central Europe. Berghahn Books, 2005.

External links
 
 

1938 films
1930s Hungarian-language films
Films directed by Ladislao Vajda
1938 drama films
Hungarian drama films
Hungarian black-and-white films